Garo, a common Armenian first name, shortened version of Karapet (Eastern Armenian) / Garabed (Western Armenian). For Eastern Armenian variant of Garo, namely Karo, refer to Karo (name)

Given name

Armenian
 Garo H. Armen, chairman and chief executive officer of Antigenics Inc
 Garo Hamamcıoğlu (born 1945), Turkish Armenian footballer 
 Garo Kahkejian (1962–1993), a famed Armenian military commander 
 Garo Mafyan (born 1951), Turkish Armenian musician and composer
 Garo Mardirossian (born 1956), Armenian-American attorney
 Garo Paylan (born 1972), Turkish Armenian politician and Member of Parliament
 Garo Sassouni (1889–1977), Armenian intellectual, author, journalist, revolutionary, educator, and public figure
 Garo Yepremian (1944–2015), American football placekicker
 Garo Zakarian (1895–1967), Soviet Armenian composer and conductor

Others
 Garo Aida (born 1949), Japanese photographer known widely for his erotic work
 Garo, a character from the manga series One-Punch Man

Surname

Armenian
 Armen Garo, Armenian nationalist politician
Sherudo Garo, fictional character, antagonist of Time Crisis

Others
Aminu Sule Garo (born 1962), Nigerian politician and businessman
 Ángel Garó (born 1965), Spanish actor and comedian
Emma Garo, a lawyer and magistrate in the Solomon Islands
Floriana Garo (born 1987), Albanian television presenter and model
Nasiru Sule Garo (born 1974), Nigerian politician, member of the Nigerian House of Representatives

See also
Karo (name)